Scombrosarda is an extinct genus of prehistoric perciform fish.

References

External links
 Bony fish in the online Sepkoski Database

Prehistoric perciform genera